John Reynolds (1670–1699) was an Irish Member of Parliament.

Biography
He was the son of James Reynolds of Loughscur, County Leitrim, and was educated at Kilkenny College and Trinity College, Dublin. A major in the Army, he was elected to Parliament for County Leitrim in 1692 and 1695. In 1695 he married Jane, daughter of Captain Edward Pottinger of Carrickfergus; they had two children, John and Mary. He died in 1699 and his widow later remarried, firstly to Sir Thomas Butler, 3rd Baronet, and secondly to Agmondisham Vesey.

References

1670 births
1699 deaths
People educated at Kilkenny College
Alumni of Trinity College Dublin
Irish officers in the British Army
Irish MPs 1692–1693
Irish MPs 1695–1699
Members of the Parliament of Ireland (pre-1801) for County Leitrim constituencies